BRP Magat Salamat (PS-20) is one of several Miguel Malvar class of patrol corvettes in service with the Philippine Navy. In 1962 she was transferred to South Vietnam for service in the Republic of Vietnam Navy as RVNS Chi Lang II (HQ-08). She was acquired by the Philippine Navy in April 1976 and later on commissioned as Magat Salamat. Along with other ex-World War II veteran ships of the Philippine Navy, she is considered one of the oldest active fighting ships in the world today.

History

US Navy
Commissioned in the US Navy as USS Gayety (AM-239) in 1945, she was assigned in the Pacific theatre of operations, specifically around the Japanese home islands providing minefield sweeping and anti-submarine warfare patrols in the Ryukyus and off Okinawa. 27 May 1945 She suffered a near-miss from a 500-pound bomb and was damaged with several casualties who were buried at Zamami shima, Okinawa, although she was quickly put back into fighting shape. After the war she was decommissioned in June 1946 and placed in the Atlantic Reserve Fleet.

Gayety was recommissioned on 11 May 1951 as a training ship, and was again decommissioned on 1 March 1954, and re-entered Atlantic Reserve Fleet. As part of the reserves, she was reclassified as MSF-239 on 7 February 1955.

Republic of Vietnam Navy
She was then transferred to the Republic of Vietnam on 17 April 1962. She served the Vietnamese Navy as RVN Chi Lăng II (HQ-08) up until her escape to the Philippines in 1975, together with other South Vietnamese Navy ships and their respective crew.

Philippine Navy
She was formally acquired by the Philippine Navy on 5 April 1976, and was commissioned into the Philippine Navy on 7 February 1977 and was renamed RPS Magat Salamat (PS-20). She was renamed to BRP Magat Salamat (PS-20) in June 1980 using a new localized prefix.

In the 1990-1993 overhaul and refit program for the 6 ships of Malvar-class patrol corvettes, PS-20 Magat Salamat wasn't included; and the following year 1994, along with her sistership PS-29 Negros Occidental, both of them was planned to be discarded instead by 1995.

But between 1996 and 1997, the Magat Salamat underwent major overhaul, weapons and radar systems refit, and upgrade of communications gear. Safe to assume, this move was caused by the Chinese incursions on the West Philippine Sea during that time which entails the Philippines' need for more ships, with PS-20 just serving for interim. Not to mention, the AFP Modernization Law was passed prior to it (1995 February) which mandates funding - thus explains the funding for her overhaul & refit.

She was assigned with the Patrol Force of the Philippine Fleet, under the jurisdiction of Naval Forces Eastern Mindanao.

In 2012 July 2 to 10, Magat Salamat was one of the participating ships in the Cooperation Afloat Readiness and Training (CARAT) 2012 - Philippines exercises.

In 2021 December 10, Magat Salamat was decommissioned alongside her sister ship Miguel Malvar, in a ceremony at Naval Base Heracleo Alano.

In 2021 December 28, just 15 days after her formal retirement, the Philippine News Agency reported that she will be used "as a temporary command post for the duration of the relief operations in the Dinagat Islands which were severely devastated by Typhoon Odette". This further demonstrated the Philippines' huge backlog of patrol ships.

Technical details
There are slight difference between BRP Magat Salamat as compared to some of her sister ships in the Philippine Navy, since her previous configuration was as a minesweeper while the others are configured as rescue escort patrol craft (PCER) and escort patrol craft (PCE) ships which both have no minesweeping equipment.

Armaments
Originally the ship was armed with one 3"/50-calibers Long dual purpose gun, one twin Bofors 40 mm guns, six single 20 mm gun mounts, one Hedgehog antisubmarine mortar projector, four K-gun depth charge projectors, and two depth charge racks.

Changes were made during its transfer to the South Vietnamese Navy, as it appears in photos show the removal of her anti-submarine weapons, removal of two Oerlikon 20 mm guns, and addition of single Bofors 40 mm guns. This made the ship lighter and ideal for surface patrols - a gun corvette, but losing her limited anti-submarine warfare capability. The same configuration applies when she was transferred to the Philippine Navy in 1975 up until around 1996–1997.

During its overhaul and refit between 1996 and 1997, the Philippine Navy made some changes in the armament set-up. Photos  on 2011 show the Bofors guns still present. Final armaments fitted to the ship are one Mk.26 3"/50-calibersLong cannon (fore), three single Bofors 40 mm cannons (aft), four Mk.10 Oerlikon 20 mm cannons (two each on bridge wings), and four M2 Browning 12.7 mm/50 caliber machine guns (two besides main bridge, two aft near the lower Bofors gun tub).

Electronics
She is fitted with Sperry Corporation's SPS-53A surface search radar and RCA SPN-18 navigation radar. Later modifications included the installation of an additional Furuno navigation radar , long range and satellite communications system, and GPS system standard to all Philippine Navy ships.

Machinery
The ship is originally powered by two Cooper Bessemer GSB-8 diesel engines, but was replaced by two GM 12-567ATL diesel engines, then later by two GM 12-278A diesel engines, with a combined rating of around  driving two propellers.

References

External links
 Philippine Navy Official website
 Philippine Fleet Official Website
 Philippine Defense Forum
 Hazegray World Navies Today: Philippines
 Opus224's Unofficial Philippine Defense Page

Ships of the Philippine Navy
1944 ships
Miguel Malvar-class corvettes
Admirable-class minesweepers
World War II mine warfare vessels of the United States